Liste der archaischen Keilschriftzeichen ("list of archaic cuneiform signs"), abbreviated LAK, is a dictionary of Sumerian cuneiform signs of the Fara period (Early Dynastic IIIa, c. 25th century BC short chronology, 26th century BC middle chronology), published in 1922 by German sumerologist and theologian P. Anton Deimel (1865–1954). The list enumerates 870 distinct cuneiform signs.

The sign inventory in the archaic period was considerably larger than the standard inventory of the later Akkadian (2350 to 2100) or Neo-Sumerian (Ur III) (21st century; all dates short chronology) periods. This means that numerous signs identified by their classical reading continue several distinct signs of the pre-classical period. 
If it is necessary to identify the pre-classical sign intended, its LAK number is customarily given, in the form of LAK-1 to LAK-870.

Deimel also published a Sumerian dictionary (Šumerisches Lexikon) in 1928.

References

P. Anton Deimel,  Liste der archaischen Keilschriftzeichen von Fara, WVDOG 40, Leipzig (1922). pdf scan (etana.org)

External links
 Liste der archaischen Keilschriftzeichen

See also
List of cuneiform signs
Early Dynastic Cuneiform

1922 non-fiction books
Cuneiform
Sumerian dictionaries